Edward White Patterson (October 4, 1895 – March 6, 1940) was a U.S. Representative from Kansas from 1935 to 1939.

Background
Born in Pittsburg, Kansas, Patterson attended local public schools. During the First World War, he served as a sergeant in the 35th Division, American Expeditionary Forces, from May 1917 to March 1919.

After the war, he attended the University of Chicago at Chicago, Illinois. He graduated from the law department of the University of Kansas at Lawrence in 1922, and was admitted to the bar the same year, commencing practice in Pittsburg, Kansas. He served as prosecuting attorney of Crawford County, Kansas from 1926 to 1928.

Congress
Patterson was elected as a Democrat to the Seventy-fourth and Seventy-fifth Congresses (January 3, 1935 – January 3, 1939). He was an unsuccessful candidate for reelection in 1938 to the Seventy-sixth Congress. He resumed the practice of law in Pittsburg, Kansas, until his death in Weir, Kansas on March 6, 1940. He was buried in Highland Park Cemetery, Pittsburg, Kansas.

References

1895 births
1940 deaths
United States Army soldiers
University of Kansas School of Law alumni
Democratic Party members of the United States House of Representatives from Kansas
20th-century American politicians
People from Pittsburg, Kansas